Nightkill is a 1980 West German-American crime horror thriller film directed by Ted Post and starring Robert Mitchum and Jaclyn Smith. The screenplay concerns an adulteress who hatches a plot to murder her millionaire husband while her lover assumes his identity. Robert Mitchum's role is touted in NightKill's promotion and credits. Though his part in the movie is very minor with minimal screentime, and needed only for the finale plot twist.

Plot
Unhappily married to unscrupulous Arizona businessman Wendell Atwell, the beautiful Katherine has been carrying on behind his back with Steve Fulton, his assistant. Knowing that a million dollars in cash has been stashed by Wendell in an airport locker, Steve plots behind his lover's back to poison her husband, then impersonate Wendell on a flight to Washington, D.C. to make it appear he is still alive.

When  police detective, Lt. Donner, turns up asking questions, claiming Wendell never turned up in Washington for a scheduled business appointment, Kathy panics and decides to move the body. But when she opens the freezer, instead of finding Wendell's corpse inside it, she finds Steve's. Kathy is constantly questioned by Lt. Donner. Later one evening, Kathy goes to take a shower while Lt. Donner fakes a phone call, just to set the possible murder of Kathy in motion. Lt. Donner shuts off the main water to the shower, with Kathy inside the shower wondering how the water stopped and now the steam turning on, Kathy is trapped inside the shower as Lt. Donner tied the doors shut. Once unconscious in the shower, Kathy's body is moved by Lt. Donner to the bathroom floor. As Lt. Donner takes the money and flees, we see Kathy on the floor calling for help on the phone as the scene fades out.

Cast
Jaclyn Smith	... 	Katherine Atwell
Robert Mitchum     ...     Lt. Donner/Kelly Rodriguez
James Franciscus	... 	Steve Fulton
Mike Connors	... 	Wendell Atwell
Fritz Weaver	... 	Herbert Childs
Sybil Danning	... 	Monika Childs
Tina Menard	... 	Consuela
Belinda Mayne	... 	Christine
Angus Scrimm	... 	Desert rat (scenes deleted)
Michael Anderson Jr.	... Lt. Donner
Melanie MacQueen	... 	Alice

Release
Nightkill was released in the United States on television, airing on NBC as the Movie of the Week on December 18, 1980.

References

External links

1980 films
1980 horror films
1980s erotic thriller films
1980s psychological thriller films
American erotic thriller films
West German films
German erotic thriller films
Films directed by Ted Post
Adultery in films
English-language German films
1980s English-language films
1980s American films
1980s German films